Borovoy is a rural locality (a settlement) in Malougryonovsky Selsoviet, Biysky District, Altai Krai, Russia. The population was 551 as of 2013. There are 9 streets.

Geography 
Borovoy is located 13 km northeast of Biysk (the district's administrative centre) by road. Malourgenyovo is the nearest rural locality.

References 

Rural localities in Biysky District